Gabriele Detti (born 29 August 1994) is an Italian competitive swimmer, who was for a time the world champion of the 800 m freestyle. He competed at the 2020 Summer Olympics.

Career highlights
At the 2012 Summer Olympics, Detti competed in the men's 1500 metre freestyle, finishing in 13th place overall in the heats, failing to qualify for the final. At the 2016 Summer Olympics, he won a bronze medal in the men's 400 metre freestyle as well as a bronze medal in the men's 1500 metre freestyle, race won by teammate Gregorio Paltrinieri. 

At the 2017 World Aquatics Championships in Budapest, Detti won the bronze medal in the  400 m. Later he won the gold medal in the 800 m, becoming the world champion in the distance and setting the new European record in a time of 7:40.77.
Two years later Detti confirmed his bronze medal in the 400 m freestyle in  Gwangju 2019, sharing the podium with Sun Yang and Mack Horton, as already happened in Rio and in Budapest.

Personal bests (LC)

References

External links

1994 births
Sportspeople from Livorno
Living people
Italian male swimmers
Olympic swimmers of Italy
Swimmers at the 2012 Summer Olympics
Italian male freestyle swimmers
European Aquatics Championships medalists in swimming
Medalists at the 2016 Summer Olympics
Swimmers at the 2016 Summer Olympics
Olympic bronze medalists for Italy
Olympic bronze medalists in swimming
World Aquatics Championships medalists in swimming
Swimmers of Gruppo Sportivo Esercito
Swimmers at the 2020 Summer Olympics
21st-century Italian people